Riyasat is a Pakistani TV serial aired in 2005, written by Asghar Nadeem Syed and directed by Kamran Qureshi. A true story of love revolves around lives of people from two different societies, today's modern Dubai and a small seaside village. A tale that covers drugs and gold smuggling, human trafficking and evasion from the law.

Plot

Qadir Jogi, (Talat Hussain), a fisherman involved in human trafficking and gold smuggling, becomes enemy of Shahnawaz Khan (Nadeem Baig), the owner of a small shipping company when he refuses to help Qadir in smuggling. The enmity reaches to the next generation, Nadir (Adnan Jilani) and Ahmed Nawaz Khan (Humayun Saeed) which starts from business competition and reaches to a woman, Sherry (Zainab Qayyum) who marries Ahmed Nawaz.  The enmity of Qadir Jogi results in losses of Shahnawaz's young daughter, and then his honest army man son-in-law lives.

Taking Seth Moosa Karim's help, Shahnawaz succeeds in getting Qadir Jogi deported from Dubai.  In return, Qadir gets Shahnawaz killed in a plane crash.  Qadir's own son Nadir, dies afterwards in a car accident during the hospitality of a Swiss Princess. Qadir Jogi, who tried to kill Shahnawaz's son twice, left alone after the accidental death of his only son Nadir.

Cast

Main cast 
 Nadeem Baig as Shahnawaz Khan (Shipping Businessman)
 Talat Hussain as Qadir Jogi (Smuggler)
 Humayun Saeed as Ahmed Nawaz
 Zainab Qayyum as Sheri
 Maria Wasti as Ayesha
 Sara Loren as Aamna
 Deeba as Shahnawaz Wife
 Rashid Mehmood as Ghani
 Maira Khan as Shani
 Adnan Jilani as Nadir
 Kunwar Nafees as Captain Shehraz

Recurring cast 
 Ismat Zaidi as Captain Sheraz's Mother
 Rashid Farooqui as Fareed
 Silvia as Princess
 Paul as British Ambassador
 Dr Ausaf Khan as Jewish businessman
 Akbar Subhani as Shani's Father
 Shan as Naveed
 Imtiaz Taj as Khalqa
 Aslam Sheikh as Malqa
 Parveen Akbar as Ayesha's Mother
Qaiser Naqvi as Shaini's Mother
 Shahzad Ali Khan as Seth Moosa Kareem
 Hareem Qureshi as Shanzabe
 Nighat Sultana as Bachai

Soundtrack
The theme song Riyasat Hai Riyasat was composed by Waqar Ali and sung by Sonu Nigam. The music video was recorded in India and released in December 2005.

Awards and nominations
5th Lux Style Awards 
 Won - Best TV Serail (Satellite) (2006)
 Won - Best TV Actress (Satellite) (2006) – Maria Wasti
 Nominated - Best TV Actor (Satellite) (2006) – Talat Hussain.
 Nominated - Best TV Director (Satellite) (2006) – Kamran Qureshi.

References

External links

 
 Facebook Page
 Director's Website
 ARY Official Website
 Actor Nadeem Baig
 Nadeem Baig's Website
 Trailer
 Hareem Qureshi's interview
 Actress Silvia
 Director Kamran Qureshi
 Co-Director Iram Qureshi
 Actor/Producer Humayun Saeed
 Actor Paul
 Making Show of Riyasat
 Director Kamran Qureshi receiving Best TV Serial Award

ARY Digital
Urdu-language television shows
Urdu-language television
Pakistani drama television series